The European Democrat Union (EDU) is one of the three European wings of the International Democrat Union, along with the European People's Party (EPP) and the Alliance of Conservatives and Reformists in Europe (ACRE). Its members include Christian democratic, liberal conservative, and conservative political parties.  It is only a nominal sub-entity of the IDU, since it ceased its activities in 2002.

Most EDU members were also members of the EPP, but the group also included 'unattached' conservatives that are unaffiliated to the EPP. These were: the British Conservative Party, the Czech Civic Democratic Party, the Icelandic Independence Party, and the Liechtenstein Patriotic Union and Progressive Citizens' Party.

In the late 1990s, the last Chairman of an independent EDU, Finnish conservative politician Sauli Niinistö, negotiated the merger of the EDU into the EPP. In October 2002, the EDU ceased its activities after being formally absorbed by the EPP at a special event in Estoril, Portugal.  In recognition of his efforts, Niinistö was elected Honorary President of the EPP in the same year.  Moreover, in April 2008, the EPP was recognized as a Regional Union by the IDU.

References

International Democrat Union